Discosadness (2002) is the debut studio album by the rock band Say Hi. Elbogen is the only performer on the album and recorded it entirely on a Windows machine which he built himself.

Track listing
 "The Fritz" – 3:02
 "They Write Books About This Sort of Thing" – 3:52
 "Laundry" – 3:07
 "The Pimp and the Sparrow" – 3:58
 "Kill the Cat" – 3:08
 "Unless the Laker Game Was On" – 3:14
 "Dersmormos" – 3:08
 "Blizzard" – 4:28
 "Pintsized Midnight Moonbeam Workers" – 1:37
 "The Showdown in Goattown" – 3:21

References

2002 debut albums
Say Hi albums